13th Visual Effects Society Awards
February 4, 2015

Best Visual Effects in a Visual Effects Driven Motion Picture:
Dawn of the Planet of the Apes

The 13th Visual Effects Society Awards was held in Los Angeles at the Beverly Hilton Hotel on February 4, 2015, in honor to the best visual effects in film and television of 2014. Patton Oswalt was the host.

Winners and nominees
(winners in bold)

Honorary Awards
VES Visionary Award:
J. J. Abrams

Film

Television

Other categories

References

External links
Visual Effects Society
 Visual Effects Society Awards 2014 at Internet Movie Database

2014
Visual Effects Society Awards
Visual Effects Society Awards
Visual Effects Society Awards
Visual Effects Society Awards